The Hispano-Suiza 8 was a water-cooled V8 SOHC aero engine introduced by Hispano-Suiza in 1914, and was the most commonly used liquid-cooled engine in the aircraft of the Entente Powers during the First World War.

Hispano-Suiza 8 engines and variants produced by Hispano-Suiza and other companies under licence were built in twenty-one factories in Spain, France, Britain, Italy, and the U.S.  Derivatives of the engine were also used abroad to power numerous aircraft types and the engine can be considered as the ancestor of another successful engine by the same designer, the Hispano-Suiza 12Y (and Soviet Klimov V12 derivative aero-engines) which was in service during the Second World War.

Design and development

Origins
At the beginning of World War I, the production lines of the Barcelona based Hispano-Suiza automobile and engine company were switched to the production of war materiel. Chief engineer Marc Birkigt led work on an aircraft engine based on his successful V8 automobile engine. The resulting engine, called the Hispano-Suiza 8A (HS-31), made its first appearance in February 1915.

The first 8A kept the standard configuration of Birkigt's existing design: eight cylinders in 90° Vee configuration, a displacement of 11.76 litres (717.8 cu in) and a power output of 140 hp at 1,900 rpm. In spite of the similarities with the original design, the engine had been substantially refined. The crankshaft was machined from a solid piece of steel. The cylinder blocks were cast aluminium and of monobloc type that is, in one piece with the SOHC cylinder heads. The inlet and exhaust ports were cast into the blocks, the valve seats were in the top face of the steel cylinder liners, which were screwed into the blocks. Using a rotating bevel gear-driven tower shaft coming up from the crankcase along the rear end of each cylinder bank, with the final drive for each cylinder bank's camshaft accommodated within a semicircular bulge at the rear end of each valve cover.  Aluminium parts were coated in vitreous enamel to reduce leakage. All parts subject to wear, and those critical for engine ignition were duplicated: spark plugs for dual ignition reliability, valve springs, magnetos, etc.

Engine reliability and power to weight ratios were major problems in early aviation. This empty weight does not include the radiator and coolant fluid. Generally, air-cooled engines are lighter than their equivalent horsepower water-cooled counterparts. The new engine was presented to the French Ministry of War in February 1915, and tested for 15 hours at full power. This was standard procedure for a new engine design to be admitted into military service. However, because of lobbying by French engine manufacturers, the Spanish-made engine was ordered to undergo a bench test that no French-made engine had yet passed: a 50-hour run at full speed. The HS-31 was therefore sent back to Chalais-Meudon on July 21, 1915, and tested for 50 hours, succeeding against all expectations. The design also promised far more development-potential than rotary engines. This was despite being the most common type, then in use, for most aircraft. Also, rotary engines were getting close to the limits of their development at this time. Rotary engines of increased power generally had increased weight, which in turn increased the already serious gyroscopic torque generated by the engine's rotation. A further increase in torque was considered unacceptable, and the power to weight ratio of the new rotary engines under development did not appeal to aircraft designers.

French officials ordered production of the 8A to be started as soon as possible and issued a requirement for a new single-seat high-performance fighter aircraft using the new engine. The Louis Béchereau-designed SPAD VII was the result of this requirement and allowed the Allies to regain air superiority over the Germans.

Variants
Some data from: British Piston Engines and their Aircraft

Note: Hispano-Suiza company type numbers were prefixed by HS- or written in full as Hispano-Suiza Type 31, but military designations used the conventional system of Hispano-Suiza(engine manufacturer) 8(no of cylinders) A(engine series) b(variant) r(attribute), thus Hispano-Suiza 8Abr.

8 (HS-31) , initial production and test engines, with few applications, including early Nieuport 14s.

8Aa (HS-31)
  at 2000 rpm, entered production in July 1915. Early HS-8A engines were plagued with various problems which required further work and was the standard powerplant for early-production SPAD VIIs and the Curtiss "Jenny" JN-4H variants. The demand for the Hispano-Suiza engine was such that other manufacturers began producing it under licence, in France, Great Britain (Wolseley Adder), Italy (Nagliati in Florence and Itala/SCAT (automobile) in Turin) and Russia. Total production of the HS-8Aa amounted to some 6,000 engines.

8Ab (HS-34)
  at 2,100 rpm, increasing the compression ratio from 4.7 to 5.3, Birkigt was able to increase the power output . The 8Ab began replacing the 8Aa on SPAD VIIs in early 1917.

8Ac

8Ad
(1929)  bore x stroke,  for take-off.

8B (HS-35)
 , compression ratio 5.3:1, geared at 0.75:1. The HS-36 was the 8B with a Lewis gun firing through the propeller boss.

8B twin (HS-39)Coupled 8B engines

8Ba
  at 2,300 rpm, low compression ratio of 4.7:1, spur geared at 0.585:1.

8Bb
 , compression ratio of 4.8:1, reduction gear 0.75:1. However the reduction gear system was fragile, and often broke down, sometimes with spectacular results ending up with the entire propeller, driveshaft and driven gear parting company from the airframe.

The 8B, 8Ba and 8Bb were used (a) to power the earliest versions of the S.E.5a, (b) along with the 8Bd, the SPAD S.XIII, (c) front-line active versions of the Sopwith Dolphin, and (d) several other Allied aircraft types, with its gear reduction easily identifiable in vintage World War I photos, from its use of a clockwise (viewed from in front, otherwise known as a left hand tractor) rotation propeller.

8Bc , compression ratio of 5.3:1, reduction gear 0.75:1.

8Bd , compression ratio of 5.3:1, reduction gear 0.75:1.
8Bda

8Be , compression ratio of 5.3:1, reduction gear 0.75:1.

8BeC (HS-38) The 8Be fitted with the  SAMC Model 37 cannon, or a similar weapon, firing through the propeller boss. A reduction gear equipped power-plant with a resultant clockwise rotation propeller like the 8B, produced  at 2,100 rpm. Two known weapons fitted were the SAMC with a rifled barrel and a smooth-bore cannon firing canister ammunition. The moteur-canon could fire a single shot at a time through the hollow drive shaft without propeller interference. This cannon mount required an "elevated" intake manifold design, bringing the intake "runners" straight off the inner surfaces of the cylinder banks to the updraft carburetor's plenum chamber. The engine was used on the SPAD S.XII.
8Ca/220 Cannon-equipped  at 2,100 rpm with 5.3:1 compression. Given the company designation HS Type 38
8Cb/180 Cannon-equipped  at 2,000 rpm with 4.7:1 compression. Given the company designation HS Type 44
8Cc/220 Cannon-equipped  at 2,100 rpm with 5.3:1 compression. Given the company designation HS Type 44

Hispano-Suiza Type 40 (8E ?)

Hispano-Suiza Type 41 (8A ?)
8F (HS-42)
  at 2,100 rpm (eq. 750 lb·ft torque). Engine speed being lower than that of the HS-8B, the reduction gear was deleted, thereby increasing engine reliability.

8Fa
generally similar to the 8F.

8Fb
 , aka HS Type 42, compression ratio of 5.3:1, direct drive.

8Fd Special
For the CAMS 38 Schneider Trophy racer developing 

8Fe (HS-42VS)
(1926)  bore x stroke,  for take-off.

Wolseley W.4A Python I
 , compression ratio of 4.7:1. License production of the 8Aa at Wolseley Motors Ltd.

Wolseley W.4A Python II
, compression ratio of 5.3 :1.

Wolseley W.4A Viper
, compression ratio of 5.3 :1. Wolseley's engineers removed problems with the crankshaft and increased the compression ratio to give more power, with some early engines having a compression ratio of 5.6:1.

Wolseley W.4A Viper II
 at 2,000 rpm.

Wolseley W.4B Adder I
, compression ratio of 4.7 :1, reduction spur gear to 0.593:1.

Wolseley W.4B Adder II
, compression ratio of 4.7 :1, reduction spur gear to 0.593:1. With stronger crankshaft webs.
Wolseley W.4B Adder III
, compression ratio of 4.7 :1, reduction spur gear to 0.593:1. With balanced crankshafts.
Wright-Hisso AWright-Martin built Type 34/HS8Aa  at 1,400 rpm and 4.72:1 compression.
Wright-Hisso B  4-cyl in-line water-cooled  
Wright-Hisso C    geared A
Wright-Hisso D    geared A with cannon
Wright-Hisso E   at 1,700 rpm and 5.33:1 compression(HC 'I')
Wright-Hisso E-2  (HC 'E')
Wright-Hisso F  ('D' without cannon)
Wright-Hisso H  , based on the Type 42/HS8F
Wright-Hisso H-2  improved 'H'
Wright-Hisso I
Wright-Hisso K  H with 37mm Baldwin cannon
Wright-Hisso K-2
Wright-Hisso M  experimental 300 hp
Wright-Hisso T 
Wright-Hisso 180 hp V-8  direct drive
Wright-Hisso 220 hp V-8  geared drive
Wright-Hisso 300 hp V-8  geared drive
M-6 A  Soviet Union produced copy of the 8Fb
Wright-Hisso V-720

Applications
 Austin-Ball A.F.B.1 (single prototype)
 Avia BH-21 (from 1925)
 Avia BH-22
 Bartel BM-5
 Bernard SIMB AB 10
 Blanchard Brd.1
 Caudron R.11 (8Bba)
 Caudron C.59
 Caudron C.61 (8Ac)
 Curtiss JN-4H Jenny (rare subvariant)
 De Bruyère C 1
 Descamps 27 (8Fb)
 Dewoitine D.1 (8Fb)
 Farman F.121 Jabiru (8Ac)
 FBA Type H (8Aa)
 Felixstowe F.1
 Fokker D.IX
 Fokker D.X (8Fb)
 Fokker D.XII (8F) initial design only
 Fokker S.III
 Gourdou-Leseurre GL.21
 Hanriot HD.5
 Hanriot HD.15
 Hanriot HD.20
 Itoh Emi 29
 Letord Let.1 (8A)
 Letord Let.2 & Let.3 (8Ba)
 Letov Š-7 (8Fb)
 Letov Š-13 (8Fb)
 Letov Š-14 (8Fb)
 Levasseur PL.1 (8Ab)
 Martinsyde F.4 Buzzard (8Fb)
 Nieuport 14 (8A)
 Nieuport-Delage NiD 29 (8Fb)
 Nieuport-Delage NiD 38 (8Ab)
 Nieuport-Delage Sesquiplan (8Fb)
 Royal Aircraft Factory S.E.5 (8Aa) and S.E.5a (8B, 8Ba or 8Bb on earliest versions and the Wolseley Viper derivative on later models)
 Sopwith Dolphin (8B)
 Sopwith B.1 prototypes (8Ba)
 SPAD S.VII (8A)
 SPAD S.XI (8Be)
 SPAD S.XII (8Cb)
 SPAD S.XIII (8Be)
 Standard J-1 (post-war modification)
 Waco DSO (8a)
 Wibault 1 (single prototype)

Wright-Hispano E
 Boeing NB-2
 AT-3
 Consolidated PT-1
 Cox-Klemin TW-2
 Curtiss AT-4
 Dayton-Wright TW-3
 Huff-Daland TW-5
 Loening M-8
 Naval Aircraft Factory TS-3
 Travel Air 3000
 Vought VE-7
 Waco DSO

Mitsubishi "Hi"shiki 
200 HP (8B)
 Yokosuka Ro-go Ko-gata
 Hanza-shiki suijō teisatsuki (ハンザ式水上偵察機, Type Hansa Surveillance Floatplane) 
300 HP (8F)
 Mitsubishi 1MF
 Mitsubishi 2MR

Comparative table

Engines on display
 A Hispano-Suiza 8Aa Type 34, made in 1916, is on public display at Museo de Aeronáutica y Astronáutica at Madrid, Spain.
 A Wright-Hisso 8A is on public display at the Aerospace Museum of California.
 A Wright-Hisso 8A is on public display at the National Museum of the U.S. Air Force

Specifications (Hispano-Suiza 8a)

See also

References

 Janes Fighting Aircraft of World War I by Michael John Haddrick Taylor (Random House Group Ltd. 20 Vauxhall Bridge Road, London SW1V 2SA, 2001), page 289

Bibliography
 "Los motores V8 de aviación de La Hispano Suiza (1914-1918)" by Jacinto García Barbero (Edited by Asociación de Amigos del Museo Del Aire, Museo de Aeronáutica y Astronáutica, CECAF. Depósito legal: M-41737-2005) 219 pages.

External links

 Old Rhinebeck Aerodrome's Hispano-Suiza V8 powered Curtiss JN-4H Jenny
 Aviation History
 Pilot Friend Aero Engines
 Hispano-Suiza 8Aa at Museo de Aeronáutica y Astronáutica.
 Moteurs d'Aviation License Hispano-Suiza (Compagnie de Fives-Lille), engine manual (types 150 hp, 180 hp, 200 hp and 220 hp)

1910s aircraft piston engines
Hispano-Suiza aircraft engines